The 88th Academy Awards ceremony, presented by the Academy of Motion Picture Arts and Sciences (AMPAS), honored the best films of 2015 and took place on February 28, 2016, at the Dolby Theatre in Hollywood, Los Angeles, 5:30 p.m. PST. During the ceremony, AMPAS presented Academy Awards (commonly referred to as Oscars) in 24 categories. The ceremony, televised in the United States by ABC, was produced by David Hill and Reginald Hudlin and directed by Glenn Weiss. Actor Chris Rock hosted the show for the second time, having previously hosted the 77th ceremony held in 2005.

In related events, the academy held its 7th Annual Governors Awards ceremony at the Grand Ballroom of the Hollywood and Highland Center on November 14, 2015. On February 13, 2016, in a ceremony at the Beverly Wilshire Hotel in Beverly Hills, California, the Academy Awards for Technical Achievement were presented by hosts Olivia Munn and Jason Segel.

Spotlight won two awards including Best Picture, making it the first film since The Greatest Show On Earth to win Best Picture while only winning one other award and Mad Max: Fury Road won six awards, the most for the evening. The Revenant earned three awards including Best Director for Alejandro G. Iñárritu and Best Actor for Leonardo DiCaprio, his first win after five previous nominations spanning two decades. Brie Larson won Best Actress for Room, while Mark Rylance and Alicia Vikander won supporting acting honors for Bridge of Spies and The Danish Girl, respectively. The telecast garnered 34.42 million viewers in the United States.

Winners and nominees 

The nominees for the 88th Academy Awards were announced on January 14, 2016, at 5:30 a.m. PST (13:30 UTC), at the Samuel Goldwyn Theater in Beverly Hills, California, by directors Guillermo del Toro and Ang Lee, Academy president Cheryl Boone Isaacs, and actor John Krasinski. The Revenant led all nominees with twelve nominations; Mad Max: Fury Road came in second with ten.

The winners were announced during the awards ceremony on February 28, 2016. With two Oscars, Spotlight was the first film since 1952's The Greatest Show on Earth to win Best Picture with only one other award. Alejandro G. Iñárritu became the third individual to win two consecutive Oscars for Best Director. By virtue of his previous nomination for his portrayal of the titular character in 1976's Rocky, Best Supporting Actor nominee Sylvester Stallone was the sixth person to be nominated for playing the same role in two different films. At the age of 87, Ennio Morricone was believed to be the oldest competitive winner in Oscar history. Having previously won for Gravity and Birdman, Emmanuel Lubezki became the first person to win three consecutive Best Cinematography awards.

Awards 
Winners are listed first, highlighted in boldface, and indicated with a double dagger.

Governors Awards 
The academy held its 7th Annual Governors Awards ceremony on November 14, 2015, during which the following awards were presented:

 Academy Honorary Awards
 Spike Lee  Filmmaker, educator, motivator, iconoclast, and artist.
 Gena Rowlands  Who has illuminated the human experience through her brilliant, passionate and fearless performances.

 Jean Hersholt Humanitarian Award
 Debbie Reynolds  For her charitable contributions and tireless efforts towards mental health as founding member of The Thalians.

Films with multiple nominations and awards

Presenters and performers 
The following individuals, listed in order of appearance, presented awards or performed musical numbers.

Presenters

Performers

Ceremony information 

Due to the mixed reception and lower ratings resulting from the previous year's ceremony, producers Neil Meron and Craig Zadan declined to helm the upcoming festivities. Shortly afterwards, actor Neil Patrick Harris announced that he would not host the Oscars for a second time. In an interview released from The Huffington Post, he said "I don't know that my family nor my soul could take it. It's a beast. It was fun to check off the list, but for the amount of time spent and the understandable opinionated response, I don't know that it's a delightful balance to do every year or even again." In September 2015, AMPAS recruited David Hill and Reginald Hudlin as producers of the ceremony. "We're delighted to have this talented team on board," AMPAS president Cheryl Boone Isaacs said in a press release announcing the decision, "David is a true innovator with a dynamic personality. His vast experience as a live events producer, coupled with Reginald's energy, creativity and talent as a filmmaker, is sure to make this year's Oscar telecast a memorable one."

The following month, Hill and Hudlin selected actor and comedian Chris Rock to host the 2016 telecast. They explained their decision to hire Rock back as host saying, "Chris Rock is truly the MVP of the entertainment industry. Comedian, actor, writer, producer, director, documentarian — he's done it all. He's going to be a phenomenal Oscar host!" Rock expressed that he was thrilled to be selected to emcee the gala again, commenting, "I'm so glad to be hosting the Oscars, it's great to be back." 

The key art and marketing for the ceremony featured the tagline "We all dream in gold", with print advertising featuring photography of past winners. AMPAS chief marketing officer Christina Kounelias explained that it was meant to reflect the Academy Awards as being both "a symbol of excellence but also this idea of 'If you can dream it, you can achieve it'".

Several other individuals participated in the production of the ceremony. Radio disc jockey and personality Ellen K served as announcer for the show. Byron Phillips and Harold Wheeler were hired as music producer and music director respectively. For a fourth consecutive year Derek McLane returned to design a new set for the show. Fatima Robinson was in charge of choreography for the broadcast. For the first time, the Oscar statuettes were manufactured by Polich Tallix Fine Art Foundry in Rock Tavern, New York. In a further effort to streamline acceptance speeches, dedications were displayed on an on-screen ticker, rather than read by the winner. Prior to introducing singer Lady Gaga's performance of Best Original Song nominee "Til It Happens to You" from the documentary film The Hunting Ground, U.S. Vice President Joe Biden pleaded with viewers to sign an online pledge supporting "It's On Us" to end campus sexual assault.

Anohni boycott
Anohni, the first transgender person to be nominated for an Academy Award in the Best Original Song category boycotted the ceremony because the producers did not consider her to perform the nominated song on stage, stating: "Everyone told me that I still ought to attend, that a walk down the red carpet would still be 'good for my career'. Last night I tried to force myself to get on the plane to fly to LA for all the nominee events, but the feelings of embarrassment and anger knocked me back, and I couldn't get on the plane." She also added: "I imagined how it would feel for me to sit amongst all those Hollywood stars, some of the brave ones approaching me with sad faces and condolences. There I was, feeling a sting of shame that reminded me of America's earliest affirmations of my inadequacy as a transperson. I turned around at the airport and went back home." Other nominees set to perform included Lady Gaga, Sam Smith, The Weeknd and Dave Grohl, who was not a nominee himself.

Box office performance of nominated films 

At the time of the nominations announcement on January 14, 2016, the combined gross of the eight Best Picture nominees at the American and Canadian box offices was $607 million, with an average of $75.8 million per film. When the nominations were announced on January 14, 2016, The Martian was the highest-grossing film among the Best Picture nominees with $226.6 million in domestic box office receipts. Mad Max: Fury Road was the second-highest-grossing film with $153.6 million; this was followed by Bridge of Spies ($70.7 million), The Revenant ($54.1 million), The Big Short ($44.6 million), Spotlight ($28.8 million), Brooklyn ($22.7 million), and Room ($5.1 million).

Of the top 50 grossing movies of the year, 46 nominations went to 11 films on the list. Only Inside Out (4th), The Martian (8th), Straight Outta Compton (18th), The Revenant (15th), Mad Max: Fury Road (21st), Creed (29th), and Bridge of Spies (42nd) were nominated for Best Picture, Best Animated Feature, or any of the directing, acting, or screenwriting awards. The other top 50 box office hits that earned nominations were Star Wars: The Force Awakens (1st), Cinderella (9th), Spectre (10th), and Fifty Shades of Grey (17th).

Criticism regarding lack of diversity 
Shortly after the nominations were announced, many news media outlets observed that there was a lack of racial diversity amongst the nominees in major categories. For the second consecutive year, all twenty acting nominees and four out of the five directors nominated were Caucasian. Activist and former attorney April Reign, who was credited with starting the hashtag #OscarsSoWhite, tweeted, "It's actually worse than last year. Best Documentary and Best Original Screenplay. That's it. #OscarsSoWhite." She also noted that while the Caucasian screenwriters of the film Straight Outta Compton earned nominations, the African American cast of the film was overlooked. As a result, the academy was ridiculed again over social media with the aforementioned hashtag. Moreover, actress Jada Pinkett Smith and director and newly minted Jean Hersholt Humanitarian Award recipient Spike Lee announced plans to boycott the ceremony and encouraged others to not watch the telecast in protest of the lack of diversity. Actor and model Tyrese Gibson and rapper 50 Cent also pressured Chris Rock to drop out of his Oscar hosting duties.

In response to the criticism, several individuals including AMPAS members voiced their opinions regarding the lack of diversity. Some members defended the academy saying that the nominations are based on performance and merit, not race. Actress Penelope Ann Miller responded to the criticism by stating "I voted for a number of black performers, and I was sorry they weren't nominated. To imply that this is because all of us are racists is extremely offensive. I don't want to be lumped into a category of being a racist because I'm certainly not and because I support and benefit from the talent of black people in this business. It was just an incredibly competitive year." In an interview with a French radio station, Best Actress nominee Charlotte Rampling said efforts to stage a boycott of the Oscars were "racist to whites." Oscar winning producer Gerald R. Molen commented, "There is no racism except for those who create an issue. That is the worst kind. Using such an ugly way of complaining," He also denounced members criticizing the academy's choices as "spoiled brats."

Others agreed that the academy had a diversity problem and supported efforts towards change. Best Supporting Actress winner Lupita Nyong'o wrote, "I am disappointed by the lack of inclusion in this year's Academy Awards nominations. It has me thinking about unconscious prejudice and what merits prestige in our culture." She concluded by saying, "I stand with my peers who are calling for change in expanding the stories that are told and recognition of the people who tell them." In a Facebook post, Best Actress winner Reese Witherspoon expressed her frustration with the lack of diversity among the nominees and added, "Nothing can diminish the quality of their work, but these filmmakers deserve recognition. As an Academy member, I would love to see a more diverse voting membership." During an interview with a reporter, President Barack Obama commented on the controversy saying, "I think when everybody's story is told, then that makes for better art. That makes for better entertainment. It makes everybody feel part of one American family. So I think, as a whole, the industry should do what every other industry should do, which is to look for talent, provide opportunity to everybody."

A week after the nominations announcement, the academy announced several rules changes regarding membership in hopes of increasing the number of women and non-white members in the membership by 2020. Beginning in 2016, new members would earn Oscar voting privileges for the next ten years. After that time period, those members may retain voting privileges for another ten years if they have remained active in the motion picture industry. Members would earn lifetime voting privileges if they have served three consecutive ten-year voting eligibility terms or have earned or won an Academy Award. Issacs justified the academy's decision to overhaul the membership requirements saying, "The Academy is going to lead and not wait for the industry to catch up; these new measures regarding governance and voting will have an immediate impact and begin the process of significantly changing our membership composition." Furthermore, the academy would establish three new governor seats that will be nominated by Isaacs and confirmed by the Board. However, the academy's actions also include taking away the membership rights of academy members who have not recently worked in the industry, such as actor Bill Mumy and award-winning screenwriter Patricia Resnick. "Replacing sexism and racism with ageism is not the answer," Resnick said.

On the morning of the Oscars, the National Action Network led by civil rights activist Al Sharpton held a protest a few blocks from the Dolby Theatre regarding the Oscar's diversity problems. "You are out of time," Sharpton said in a rebuke to the academy. "We are not going to allow the Oscars to continue. This will be the last night of an all-white Oscars." In addition, African-American filmmakers Ryan Coogler and Ava DuVernay held a charity event addressing the water crisis in Flint, Michigan, called #JusticeForFlint, on the same night as the Oscars. Despite organizers insisting that the event was being held almost simultaneously with the Oscars, many viewed it as an alternative to watching the ceremony.

Asian accountants joke 
During the show, Rock introduced onstage three children of Asian heritage posing as accountants for PricewaterhouseCoopers saying "They sent us their most dedicated, accurate, and hard-working representatives... Please welcome Ming Zhu, Bao Ling and David Moskowitz." He also added, "If anybody's upset about that joke, just tweet about it on your phone that was also made by these kids." In response to the segment, U.S. Congresswoman Judy Chu expressed her disappointment at Rock, broadcaster ABC, and AMPAS in a press release that read, "It is not right to protest the exclusion of one group by making jokes at the expense of another. I am so disappointed that the Academy and ABC would rely on such offensive characterizations, especially given the controversy over the lack of diversity." Actress Constance Wu tweeted, "To parade little kids on stage w/no speaking lines merely to be the butt of a racist joke is reductive & gross." Furthermore, 25 AMPAS members of Asian descent, including actors Nancy Kwan, Sandra Oh, and George Takei, and director Ang Lee, signed a letter condemning Rock's skit, saying, "In light of criticism over #OscarsSoWhite, we were hopeful that the telecast would provide the Academy a way forward and the chance to present a spectacular example of inclusion and diversity. Instead, the Oscars show was marred by a tone-deaf approach to its portrayal of Asians."

In a phone interview with the Associated Press, Academy President Isaacs apologized for the joke, stating, "I can understand the feelings, and we are setting up a meeting to discuss, because, as you well know, no one sets out to be offensive, and I'm very sorry that has happened. I think so much is achieved with dialogue, so much is achieved. And that is what we'll continue to do: have dialogue, listen, and just keep fixing."

Critical reception and television ratings 
The show received a mixed reception from media publications. A few media outlets reviewed the broadcast more positively with some praise for Rock. Television critic Mary McNamara of the Los Angeles Times remarked, "Rock's Oscars had some of the most powerful moments seen in the telecast's history." She concluded that, "After years of being dissed for its irrelevance, this year's Oscars took action. The results were mixed, to be sure, and Rock did not ever settle into his usual balance of outrage and humanity." The New York Times columnist James Poniewozik commented, "With Chris Rock, the Oscars find a lucky pairing of host and subject." In addition, he wrote, "His performance was an example of something the industry is still trying to learn: that you can achieve both inclusion and entertainment by giving the right person just the right opportunity." The Denver Posts Joanne Ostrow wrote, "Chris Rock poked the elephant in the room at the 2016 Academy Awards, prodded it again and again, and never let up."

Others were more critical of the show. The Hollywood Reporter columnist Daniel Feinberg remarked, "Chris Rock led a telecast that had important things to say, but still felt endless." In addition, Feinberg called the ceremony "overstuffed" and the on-screen running scroll a "total failure". Frazier Moore of the Associated Press quipped, "When Rock was absent, languor prevailed." He added, "One other beef: The attempt to banish the names of those thanked by winners to a text crawl at the bottom of the screen. If viewers wanted to watch a channel with annoying and distracting text at the bottom of the screen, they'd just tune to a cable-news channel." Orlando Sentinel television critic Hal Boedeker gave high marks toward Rock but commented, "No host, no matter how gifted, can transform the lumbering format into a scintillating event." He ended his comments by stating, "Staging a more entertaining Oscar telecast. Why must the show be a slog?"

The American telecast on ABC drew 34.42 million people over its length, which was a 4% decrease from the previous year's ceremony. An estimated 58 million total viewers watched all or part of the awards. The telecast also garnered lower Nielsen ratings compared to the previous ceremony with a 23.4 household rating. In addition, the program scored lower in the 18-49 demo rating with a 10.5 rating over a 31% share. It was the lowest viewership for an Academy Awards telecast since the 80th ceremony, held in 2008.

In July 2016, the ceremony presentation received nine nominations for the 68th Primetime Emmys. The following month, the ceremony did not win any of the nominations.

In Memoriam
The annual "In Memoriam" tribute was presented by actor Louis Gossett Jr. Singer Dave Grohl performed The Beatles' song "Blackbird" during the tribute.

 Wes Craven – Director 
 Stan Freberg – Voice actor
 Saeed Jaffrey – Actor
 Miroslav Ondricek – Cinematographer
 Robert Balser – Animation director
 Lizabeth Scott – Actress
 Stuart Reiss – Set decorator
 Chantal Akerman – Director, writer
 Christopher Lee – Actor
 Robert Chartoff – Producer
 Murray Weissman – Publicist
 Jerry Weintraub – Producer
 James L. White – Writer
 Theodore Bikel – Actor
 Robert Loggia – Actor
 Barbara Brogliatti – Public relations executive
 Maureen O'Hara – Actress
 Gene Allen – Production designer, academy president
 Omar Sharif – Actor
 Louis DiGiaimo – Casting director
 Patricia Norris – Costume designer
 Dean Jones – Actor
 Ettore Scola – Director, writer
 Alan Rickman – Actor
 Haskell Wexler – Cinematographer
 Karolyn Ali – Producer
 Tex Rudloff – Sound mixer
 Richard Corliss – Film critic
 John B. Mansbridge – Art director
 Alex Rocco – Actor
 Kirk Kerkorian – Executive
 Bob Minkler – Sound mixer
 Douglas Slocombe – Cinematographer
 David W. Samuelson – Cameraman, inventor
 James Horner – Composer
 Bruce Sinofsky – Documentarian
 Frank D. Gilroy – Writer
 Holly Woodlawn – Actress
 James Elmo Williams – Film editor, producer, executive
 Howard A. Anderson – Visual effects
 Roger L. Mayer – Executive, film preservation advocate
 Albert Maysles – Documentarian
 Melissa Mathison – Writer
 Richard Glatzer – Director, writer
 David Bowie – Musician, actor
 Vilmos Zsigmond – Cinematographer
 Daniel Gerson – Writer, voice actor
 Leonard Nimoy – Actor

See also 
 22nd Screen Actors Guild Awards
 36th Golden Raspberry Awards
 58th Grammy Awards
 68th Primetime Emmy Awards
 69th British Academy Film Awards
 70th Tony Awards
 73rd Golden Globe Awards
 List of submissions to the 88th Academy Awards for Best Foreign Language Film

Notes and references

Notes

References

External links 

Official websites
 Academy Awards Official website
 The Academy of Motion Picture Arts and Sciences Official website
 Oscar's Channel at YouTube (run by the Academy of Motion Picture Arts and Sciences)

News resources
 Oscars 2016 at BBC News
 Oscars 2016 at The Guardian

Analysis
 Academy Awards, USA: 2016 IMDb
 2015 Academy Awards winners and History at the Filmsite.org

Other resources
 

Academy Awards ceremonies
2015 film awards
2016 awards in the United States
2016 in American cinema
February 2016 events in the United States
2016 in Los Angeles
Television shows directed by Glenn Weiss